Isha Lakhani (29 April 1985) is an Indian former professional tennis player.

Biography
Lakhani was born in Mumbai. Her career high in singles is world No. 291, achieved on 19 May 2008. In doubles, she peaked at No. 371 on 1 December 2008.

In her career, she won four singles and seven doubles titles on the ITF Women's Circuit.

Playing for India Fed Cup team, Lakhani has a win–loss record of 9–4.

ITF Circuit finals

Singles: 12 (4–8)

Doubles: 13 (7–6)

External links
 
 
 

1985 births
Living people
Asian Games medalists in tennis
Indian female tennis players
Racket sportspeople from Mumbai
Sindhi people
Tennis players at the 2006 Asian Games
Sportswomen from Maharashtra
21st-century Indian women
21st-century Indian people
Medalists at the 2006 Asian Games
Asian Games silver medalists for India